Crystal Lake is a Japanese metalcore band from Tokyo, formed in 2002. The band comprises vocalist John Robert Centorrino, guitarists Yudai Miyamoto and Hisatsugu Taji, bassist Mitsuru, and drummer Gaku Taura, who is a former member of Nocturnal Bloodlust. After Shinya Hori's departure, Miyamoto is the only member of the original line-up who remains in the band. Crystal Lake have released five studio albums. Their latest studio album, Helix, was released on 28 November 2018.

History

Formation and first releases (2002–2005)
Crystal Lake was formed in 2002 in Tokyo, Japan. Their first demo, Freewill, was released in February in time for the show in Korea which they were invited to by GMC Records. The second demo, One Word Changes Everything, came out in July, and a self-released four-track EP, also entitled Freewill was released in September with 1000 copies made and sold. In September 2003, Crystal Lake played five shows in Japan with Australian band Day of Contempt.

From March to June 2004, they toured with Loyal to the Grave and Extinguish the Fire. Following the end of the tour, the bands released a split album titled Blood of Judas on CD and DVD.

On 29 April 2005, the band released their second split album with Risen and Unboy titled 3 Way Split. They also toured in Malaysia.

Dimension and Taste of Chaos 2007 (2006–2007)
In February 2006, they performed at Independence D. On 5 July 2006, the band released their first studio album titled Dimension through Imperium Recordings. After the release of the album, they went on "Dimension Tour" in Japan.

In February 2007, they performed at Metal Presentation with Australian band I Killed the Prom Queen and Hatebreed on "Hatebreed Japan Tour" in March. In November 2007, they played on Rockstar's "Taste of Chaos" in Japan.

Third split album and Taste of Chaos 2008 (2008–2009)
In May 2008, they released their third split album on CD with the Japanese punk band Cleave. In November 2008, they performed again at Rockstar's "Taste of Chaos" in Japan.

In January 2009, they toured in Japan with Parkway Drive and Shai Hulud.

Into the Great Beyond and Nishimura's departure (2010–2011)
On 27 May 2010, Crystal Lake released free download demo Endeavor on their MySpace page. Crystal Lake also announced through MySpace, Twitter, Facebook and YouTube a new music video "Twisted Fate" from their upcoming second studio album titled Into the Great Beyond. On 11 June 2011, the founding vocalist Kentaro Nishimura left the band.

Line-up change and Cubes (2012–2015)
On 24 March 2012, the original drummer Yusuke Ishihara left the band. On 3 July, they announced their new vocalist Ryo Kinoshita on their Facebook page with a statement: "Today, we are pleased to announce the newest addition to the Crystal Lake Family, please give a warm welcome the new vocalist Ryo." The next day, the band announced that Gaku Taura will be their support on drums. They also announced that they were going to release a new single in summer. On 5 September, they released two new singles "The Fire Inside" and "Overcome" which was mixed and mastered by Brian Hood at 456 Recordings.

From 26 January to 1 February 2013, they toured with As Blood Runs Black and Confession. In May 2013, they toured with The Ghost Inside and Continents. After that they shared the stage with Emmure and they toured across Japan on the Sumerian Tour 2013 with Born of Osiris, Upon a Burning Body and Her Name in Blood. Later in 2013, the band went on a supporting tours for Coldrain, Her Name in Blood, Crossfaith, Before My Life Fails, SiM, and Totalfat.

On 9 February 2014, they played at the Scream Out Fest 2014 with The Devil Wears Prada, Periphery, The Word Alive, Fear, and Loathing in Las Vegas, and Her Name in Blood at Shinkiba Studio Coast, Tokyo. On 12 April, they played on the Monster Energy Outburn Tour 2014 with Coldrain, Crossfaith, and Miss May I in Sapporo.

Later in 2014, the band announced that their first EP titled Cubes via YouTube page, is set to release on 6 August 2014. A music video for the new song "Ups & Downs" was released on 28 July. On 4 August, a music video was released for their cover of Limp Bizkit's song "Rollin'". On 6 August, they released the new EP Cubes via Cube Records. Cubes debuted at No. 5 on the Oricon (Japanese music chart) indie weekly album chart, at No. 45 on the weekly album chart and at No. 27 on the daily album chart.

On 8 August, they headlined the "True North Project Tour", with support from Infection, Prompts, Sailing Before the Wind, Scarface, and Shark Ethic. They toured on the Crossfaith's "ACROSS THE FUTURE Tour" with We Came as Romans and While She Sleeps in September. On 25 October, they started their headlining tour "Cubes Tour" 2014. On 15 November, they performed at the Knotfest Japan 2014.

On 3 August 2015, it was announced that bassist Yasuyuki Kotaka had decided to leave the band due to his illness.

Signing to Artery Recordings, The Sign and True North (2015–2017)
On 7 September 2015, Crystal Lake announced they had signed to Artery Recordings in the U.S. and JPU Records in the UK and Europe and would be releasing their following third studio album The Sign on 7 October 2015 through these labels. On 30 November 2016, Crystal Lake released their fourth studio album True North. They later released two new singles, "Apollo" and "Machina" in 2017.

Signing to SharpTone Records and Helix (2018–2019)
Crystal Lake released the single and accompanying video for "The Circle" on 6 August 2018. The three-track release for The Circle was released on 8 August.

On 28 November, SharpTone Records announced that they had signed Crystal Lake to the label. The band released a new single and accompanying video for the song "Aeon". On the same day, the band released their fifth studio album, Helix, exclusively in Japan with an international release following in 2019. In 2019, Crystal Lake will support August Burns Red, Miss May I, and Fit for a King on "The Dangerous Tour" in North America. In March, the group went on Adept's Russian Tour as a warm up. They also headlined the 2019 "Never Say Die Tour" with In Hearts Wake, King, Our Hollow Our Home, Polar, Alpha Wolf, and Great American Ghost.

Hori's departure, The Voyages and Kinoshita's departure (2020–present)
On 8 July 2020, the band released a brand new single titled "Watch Me Burn" and its corresponding music video. On 9 July, a day after the new release, the band announced that the founding rhythm guitarist Shinya Hori would be taking a hiatus for personal reasons.

On 3 August, the band re-released their song "Into the Great Beyond" from their second studio album of the same name alongside an accompanying music video. At the same time, the band announced that an album consisting of re-recorded material from their Kentaro Nishimura era, titled The Voyages, which released on 5 August 2020, while also revealing the album cover and the track list. On 21 November, the band officially announced that Hori's hiatus would become a permanent departure due to "personal reasons".

In July 2021, the band released the single "Curse", accompanied by an official music video for the song, uploaded onto their YouTube channel. Along with the music video, it was announced that touring members Gaku Taura, and Mitsuru were made official members of the band. Along with the addition of a new rhythm guitarist, Hisatsugu "TJ" Taji. On 28 September 2022, Ryo Kinoshita announced that he left the band revealing that he has been dealing with an illness known as adjustment disorder that has made it difficult for him to continue with the group. The illness afflicted Kinoshita over the past five years which made him the decision to step away from the group. On March 11, 2023, Crystal Lake announced that they have recruited John Robert Centorrino formerly of The Last Ten Seconds of Life as their new full-time vocalist.

Musical style
Crystal Lake's musical style has been described as metalcore, progressive metal, nu metal, and deathcore.

Members

Current
 Yudai "YD" Miyamoto – lead guitar (2002–present); backing vocals (2012–present)
 Gaku Taura – drums (2021–present; touring 2012–2021)
 Mitsuru – bass (2021–present; touring 2017–2021)
 Hisatsugu "TJ" Taji – rhythm guitar (2021–present)
 John Robert Centorrino – lead vocals (2023–present)

Former
 Seiji Nagasawa – bass (2002–2007)
 Kentaro Nishimura – lead vocals (2002–2011)
 Yusuke Ishihara – drums (2002–2012)
 Yasuyuki Kotaka – bass (2007–2015)
 Teruki Takahashi – bass (2015–2016)
 Shinya Hori – rhythm guitar (2002–2020)
 Ryo Kinoshita – lead vocals (2012–2022)

Touring musicians
 Bitoku Sakamoto – bass (2015; 2016–2018; 2023)

Timeline

Discography

Studio albums

Extended plays

Split albums

Compilation albums

Singles

Collaborations

Other appearances

Music videos

References

External links
 Official website
 

Japanese metalcore musical groups
Deathcore musical groups
Japanese progressive metal musical groups
Musical groups established in 2002
2002 establishments in Japan
Musical groups from Tokyo